Gaia Palma (born 8 March 1990) is an Italian female rower, medal winner at senior level at the European Rowing Championships.

References

External links
 

1990 births
Living people
Italian female rowers
Sportspeople from Turin